"Columbus" is a song by Swedish alternative rock band Kent. It was released as the second single from the band's 2007 album Tillbaka till samtiden, on 3 December 2007 as digital download, and on 3 December 2007 as a four track CD single. It contains the non-album track "Tick tack" and two additional remixes.

Track listing

Charts

References

External links 
Columbus at Discogs

Kent (band) songs
2007 singles
Song recordings produced by Joshua (record producer)
Songs written by Martin Sköld
Songs written by Joakim Berg
2007 songs
Sony BMG singles